Crescentia, a Latin word meaning growth, can refer to:

Crescentia, a genus of trees in the family Bignoniaceae
Saint Crescentia, female martyr with Saint Vitus whose nurse she had been
 Crescentia (romance), an Old High German chivalric romance
 The Crescentia cycle, a grouping of romances similar in plot to the original Crescentia, including such works as Le Bone Florence of Rome
 660 Crescentia, asteroid